Karl Schlösser (29 January 1912 – 1982) was a German international footballer.

References

1912 births
1982 deaths
Association football forwards
German footballers
Germany international footballers